The Veiled Woman is a 1922 American silent drama film directed by Lloyd Ingraham and starring Marguerite Snow, Edward Coxen and Landers Stevens.

Cast
 Marguerite Snow as Elvina Grey
 Edward Coxen as The Piper
 Landers Stevens as The Doctor
 Lottie Williams as Aunt Hitty
 Ralph McCullough as The Doctor's Son
 Charlotte Pierce as Araminta Lee

References

Bibliography
 Munden, Kenneth White. The American Film Institute Catalog of Motion Pictures Produced in the United States, Part 1. University of California Press, 1997.

External links
 

1922 films
1922 drama films
1920s English-language films
American silent feature films
Silent American drama films
American black-and-white films
Films directed by Lloyd Ingraham
Films distributed by W. W. Hodkinson Corporation
1920s American films